,  was a third-class airport located  from Ishigaki city centre in Okinawa Prefecture, Japan. The airport provided flights to major cities on the Japanese mainland as well as destinations throughout Okinawa Prefecture and the Yaeyama Islands. Commercial operations at Ishigaki Airport ceased at 00:00 on 6 March 2013, and the new Ishigaki Airport opened on 7 March 2013. As of mid-2013, the possibility exists that the airport may be turned over fully to the Japanese Self-Defense Forces. As a Type-3 airport, the JSDF was already in theory able to carry out operations from Ishigaki.

History
The airport was opened in 1943 for military use, and converted to a civilian airport in 1956.

Replacement 

The airport served about 1.8 million passengers a year, making it the second busiest third-class airport in Japan, behind Kobe Airport, and traffic grew steadily as the Yaeyama Islands become a popular tourist destination. The runway of Ishigaki Airport could not accommodate planes larger than a Boeing 737, and the present site was not suitable for expansion due to urban encroachment. The airport also did not have facilities for handling standard cargo containers.

To meet these needs, New Ishigaki Airport was constructed on the eastern side of the island, replacing Ishigaki Airport. Plans for the new airport dated to 1979, when the prefectural government planned to build a  runway by the shore of the Shiraho (白保) district. However, due to concerns about coral, the residents of Shiraho long opposed the project. In addition, historical artifacts from the Shiraho Saonetabaru Cave Ruins some 18,000 to 15,000 years old were discovered, affecting the timeline of the project.

Construction started in October 2006, and the new airport opened in 2013.

Notes

References

External links

 Ishigaki Airport
 New Ishigaki Airport (in Japanese)
 Ishigaki Airport Guide from Japan Airlines
 
 

Airports established in 1943
Airports disestablished in 2013
Defunct airports in Japan
Japan Self-Defense Forces
Airports in Okinawa
1943 establishments in Japan
2013 disestablishments in Japan